The Castanet Club is a 1991 Australian film starring the popular Newcastle cabaret troupe, The Castanet Club.

References

External links

The Castanet Club at Oz Movies

Australian musical comedy films
1990s musical comedy films
1991 films
1990s English-language films
1990s Australian films